The Rock is the sixth solo studio album by English musician John Entwistle of the Who. It was Entwistle's first album since Too Late the Hero in 1981, and his only solo album to be issued by Griffin Music.

The album was recorded over a period of eighteen months between 1985 and 1986 at Entwistle's Hammerhead Studios in Gloucestershire. It was originally planned for release by WEA in 1986 but it was not officially released until ten years later. The album has been released in four different editions between 1996 and 2005, each time with different artwork.

The Rock was Entwistle's only album in which he did not sing the lead vocals on any tracks, a role performed instead by American-born Canadian Henry Small, formerly of  the band Prism.

The album was re-released in Europe in 2005 on Castle Music, featuring rare bonus content. The reissue was a CD comprising sixteen tracks. It includes the original album, digitally remastered from the original 1/2" mix tapes, alongside three outtakes - two of which were written by and feature Andy Nye on keyboards - and one demo and early versions of the songs featured on the album.

Tour
Eight years before the album was officially released there was a supporting tour for it, which lasted from June to August 1988, covering the United States and Canada.

Critical reception
Mark Deming of AllMusic retrospectively gave the album two and a half out of five stars and wrote that "There's no questioning the technical skill of the performances -- this band sounds tight and expert throughout, and Entwistle and [Zak] Starkey are a mighty rhythm section -- but most of Small's songs are a mass of clichés and the guitar and keyboard figures firmly date this album as a product of the mid-'80s." adding that "The Rock trades [Entwistle's] more distinctive work for faceless cookie-cutter hard rock, and there's no denying he could do better."

Track listing

Additional tracks

Personnel
Credits are adapted from the album's liner notes.
John Entwistle – bass guitar; trumpet; trombone
Henry Small – lead and background vocals; trumpet; trombone
Gene Black – guitar
Devin Powers (Mark R. Adams) – guitar
Zak Starkey – drums
Adrian Cook – keyboards

Production
Martin Adam – producer; engineer
The Rock – producer 
John Entwistle – post-production; cover design
Bob Pridden – post-production
Jon Astley – mastering

See also
 List of albums released in 1996
 John Entwistle's discography

References

External links

1996 albums
John Entwistle albums